These are the official results of the Women's 400 metres hurdles event at the 1986 European Championships in Stuttgart, West Germany, held at Neckarstadion on 28, 29, and 30 August 1986.

Results

Final
30 August

Semi-finals
29 August

Semi-final 1

Semi-final 2

Heats
28 August

Heat 1

Heat 2

Heat 3

Participation
According to an unofficial count, 24 athletes from 15 countries participated in the event.

 (1)
 (3)
 (1)
 (1)
 (2)
 (1)
 (1)
 (2)
 (2)
 (2)
 (3)
 (1)
 (1)
 (1)
 (2)

See also
 1982 Women's European Championships 400m Hurdles (Athens)
 1983 Women's World Championships 400m Hurdles (Helsinki)
 1984 Women's Olympic 400m Hurdles (Moscow)
 1987 Women's World Championships 400m Hurdles (Rome)
 1988 Women's Olympic 400m Hurdles (Seoul)
 1990 Women's European Championships 400m Hurdles (Split)

References

 Results

Hurdles 400
400 metres hurdles at the European Athletics Championships
1986 in women's athletics